Highway 407 is a Toronto Transit Commission (TTC) subway station on Line 1 Yonge–University of the Toronto subway. It is located at the southwest quadrant of the Jane Street and Highway 407 interchange, in Vaughan, Ontario, Canada. It is one of two Toronto subway stations that are outside the city of Toronto, the other being Vaughan Metropolitan Centre station.

Description

The design team for the station was AECOM as the prime consultant, Aedas as design architect, and Parsons Brinckerhoff as design engineers. The station is an intermodal transit facility providing connections to York Region Transit (YRT), GO Transit buses, and Ontario Northland intercity coaches. It will also connect to a future Highway 407 Transitway. The station has a 550-space commuter parking lot and a large 18-bay regional bus terminal. This station has been engineered and positioned for the construction of underground bus platforms for the proposed Highway 407 Transitway. The station has an open design, particularly to the east overlooking the Black Creek. Due to structural elements related to the water table, the centre platform has no columns, with all weight being transferred to the sides to counter buoyancy. The station has a metal cool roof to reflect heat from the sun.

Toronto artist David Pearl designed the artwork titled Sky Ellipse consisting of multi-coloured glass panels for the subway skylights and the western bus terminal glass facade. The panels show moving projections of colour. Sunlight filters down to platform level.

History
On November 27, 2009, the official groundbreaking ceremony was held for the Toronto–York Spadina Subway Extension (TYSSE), and major tunnelling operations began in June 2011. The extension and station opened on December 17, 2017.

While Highway 407, along with the five other TYSSE stations, had a fare booth installed as per original station plans, the booth never housed collectors as the station was among the first eight to discontinue sales of legacy TTC fare media. Presto vending machines were available at its opening to sell Presto cards and to load funds or monthly passes onto them. On May 3, 2019, this station became one of the first ten stations to sell Presto tickets via Presto vending machines.

In 2018, Highway 407 station had the second-lowest usage of the six new stations along the TYSSE, at 3,400 people per day. However, after GO bus routes were changed to terminate at Highway 407 station instead of the York University campus, usage at Highway 407 station was expected to increase, as much of the ridership at this station comes from York University students and staff transferring from GO buses. Consequently in 2019, the station saw a surge in usage with 13,956 people per day.

Fare zone
To avoid implementing a payment-on-exit system, the station is part of the Toronto TTC fare zone despite being located in York Region. This is in contrast to TTC-contracted bus routes, where riders are required to pay extra fare (for YRT) when travelling beyond the municipal boundary at Steeles Avenue. This is analogous to the situation in 1968, when the TTC had an internal fare zone system and "Zone 2" fares were charged when crossing the zones on surface routes, yet no extra fare was required to reach five new subway stations which opened outside the pre-amalgamation Toronto city limits in Zone 2 that year. Zone 2 fares were charged, however, when transferring to connecting bus routes in the suburban municipalities of Metropolitan Toronto. Similarly, at this station (as well as at the adjacent ), separate fares are charged when transferring between the TTC subway and connecting YRT local buses, which are the only surface routes serving it.

Between January 2018 and March 2020, there was a $1.50 fare discount for GO bus riders transferring to or from the TTC subway if paying a single fare by Presto card.

Highway 407 Bus Terminal

There are no connecting TTC buses at this station, but the regional bus terminal, located outside the station's fare-paid area, serves YRT and GO Transit bus routes, as well as Ontario Northland intercity coaches. It is the only regional bus terminal serving a TTC subway station that is part of the main station building and is the largest bus terminal in the GO Transit system with 18 bus bays (13 for GO Transit and 5 for YRT) plus 17 layover bays. It includes a GO customer service counter, Presto and GO ticket vending machines, and washrooms.

YRT routes serving the terminal:

GO Transit routes serving the terminal:

Ontario Northland also serves the station with two daily northbound and two daily southbound trips on its Toronto–North Bay route, as well as two daily trips in each direction from Toronto–Sudbury.

References

External links

Line 1 Yonge–University stations
Railway stations in Canada opened in 2017
2017 establishments in Ontario
Railway stations in the Regional Municipality of York